The Hrusish or Southeast Kamengic languages possibly constitute a Sino-Tibetan branch in Arunachal Pradesh, northeast India. They are Hruso (Aka) and Mijiic. In Glottolog, Hammarström, et al. does not accept Hrusish, and considers similarities between Hruso and Miji to be due to loanwords.

Names
George van Driem (2014) and Bodt & Lieberherr (2015) use the name Hrusish, while Anderson (2014) prefers Southeast Kamengic.

Classification
Anderson (2014) considers Hrusish to be a branch of Tibeto-Burman. However, Blench and Post (2011) suggest that the Hruso languages likely constitute an independent language family.

Bodt's & Lieberherr's (2015:69) internal classification of the Hrusish languages is as follows.
Hrusish
Hruso (ʁuso, Aka)
Miji-Bangru
Western Miji (Đəmmai, Sadʑalaŋ)
Eastern Miji (Nəmrai, Wadu Baŋru)
Bangru (Tadə Baŋru, Tadʑu Baŋru, Ləwjɛ, Ləvai)

Comparative vocabulary
The following comparative vocabulary table of Hrusish vocabulary items (Bangru, Miji, and Hruso) is from Anderson (2014), with additional Bangru data from Li (2003). Anderson's (2014) Hruso data is from Anderson's own field notes and from Simon (1970). Anderson's (2014) Miji data is from his own field notes as well as Simon (1979) and Weedall (2014). Bangru data is from Ramya (2011, 2012).

Reconstruction
Proto-Hrusish has been reconstructed in by Bodt & Lieberherr (2015). Bodt & Lieberherr (2015:101) note that Proto-Hrusish displays a sound change from Proto-Tibeto-Burman *s- to  t-, which they note had also occurred in Bodo-Garo, Kuki-Chin, Tangkhulic, Central Naga, and Karbi languages. The Proto-Tibeto-Burman *-l and -r have also been lost in Proto-Hrusish.

Reconstructed Proto-Hrusish forms from Bodt & Lieberherr (2015) are given below.

 *nə-paŋ 'aconite'
 *si-ni 'ant'
 *pri 'awake'
 * 'axe'
 *mə-niŋ 'bad'
 *bra 'bamboo (big)'
 * 'bark (tree)'
 *sə-t͡saŋ 'bear'
 *majk 'bee'
 *mə-doʔ 'big (thick, wide)'
 *bə-dow 'bird'
 *taʔ 'bite'
 *kam 'bitter'
 *jaC 'blood'
 *mə-muC 'body'
 *lu 'boil (water)'
 *mə-ri-jaŋ 'bone'
 *gə-raj 'bow'
 *mə-nuŋ 'breast; milk'
 * 'broom'
 *su 'cane; rope'
 * 'chicken'
 *mə-ga-daʔ 'chin'
 *gi-le 'cloth'
 *majməwŋ 'cloud'
 *ku 'cook'
 *su 'cow'
 *kraC 'cry'
 *taj 'cut'
 *ga 'day'
 *mə-ruk 'deep'
 *θəj 'die'
 *taC 'dig'
 *ni-t͡ɕi 'dirty'
 *ru 'do'
 *piŋ 'door'
 *tai-mə 'dream'
 *tuŋ 'drink'
 *t͡ɕa 'eat'
 *do-riŋ 'egg'
 *sə-giC 'eight'
 *(a/mə)ko 'elder brother'
 *mə-hi-laŋ 'empty'
 *t͡səj 'excrete, defecate'
 *mə-jaʔ 'eye'
 *mə-rəŋ 'far'
 *mə-baC 'fat (n)'
 *ri 'fear'
 *mejʔ 'few'
 *rəj 'fight'
 *mə-guC-t͡ɕoʔ 'finger'
 *maj 'fire'
 *laC 'fireplace'
 *trV 'fish'
 *bə-ŋu 'five'
 *mə-boC 'flower'
 *mə-d͡ʑoC 'friend'
 *d͡ʑuC 'frog'
 *θai 'fruit'
 *bə-ləj 'four'
 *liŋ 'full'
 *kikmuŋ 'garlic, onion'
 *bəj 'give'
 *se-preN 'goat'
 *rajC 'grind, crush'
 *mə-luŋ 'guts'
 *go-pu 'hair'
 *mə-gaŋ-lo 'hard'
 *mə-guC 'hand, arm'
 *du 'have, exist'
 *mə-go-kuŋ 'head'
 *mə-luŋ-wəwC 'heart'
 *mə-ləj 'heavy'
 *mə-su 'horn'
 *nam 'house'
 *kə-na 'how many'
 *niC 'human'
 *bə-luŋ 'hundred'
 *noC 'ill'
 *bəw-luŋ 'insect'
 *suN 'iron'
 *gə-d͡ʑuk 'itch'
 *dəgraŋ 'kick'
 *gajC 'kill'
 *vaj-t͡suŋ 'knife'
 *ni 'know'
 *toC 'laugh'
 *mə-rajC 'leaf'
 *lə-wajC 'leech'
 *laj 'leg'
 *laŋ 'lift'
 *mə-lə-taŋ 'light'
 *t͡ɕi 'liquor'
 *rej 'listen, hear'
 *siŋ 'live, grow up'
 *mə-θin 'liver'
 *mə-pjaŋ 'long'
 *gaŋ 'look, see'
 *saC 'louse'
 *daj 'make; do'
 *niC 'man (male)'
 *su 'meat'
 *lu 'month'
 *lu 'moon'
 *mə-nuŋ 'mouth; language'
 *lu-lV 'mortar'
 *me-naj 'mother'
 *mə-mjiŋ 'name'
 *mə-nej 'near'
 *ta- 'negative imperative'
 *mə-gə-nu 'new'
 *nə-gaC 'night'
 *sə-tiŋ 'nine'
 *mə-ɕoʔ 'old'
 *a-ken 'one'
 *an 'paddy rice'
 *bə-laC 'pestle'
 *jowʔ 'pig'
 *go-kuN 'pillow'
 *nə-dəj; *pro 'rain'
 *t͡ɕaʔ 'red'
 *gə-leC 'ring'
 *lam-baŋ 'road'
 *mə-kriŋ 'root'
 *mə-də-rəw 'round'
 *lu 'salt'
 *sə-gə-raj 'sand'
 *mə-θai 'seed'
 *laC 'sell'
 *mə-ljak 'seven'
 * 'sew'
 *mə-nuŋ 'short'
 *mə-ma 'sister (elder)'
 *d͡ʑuC 'sit, stay'
 *reC 'six'
 *mə-prja 'skin'
 *nə-də-laŋ 'sky'
 *d͡ʑV 'sleep'
 *maj-kən 'smoke (n)'
 *bəw 'snake'
 *dəren 'snow'
 *mə-lə-prjuC 'soft, smooth'
 *naʔ 'soil'
 *təwC 'speak'
 *d͡ʑuŋ 'spear'
 *məsu 'spicy'
 *jeʔ 'spittle'
 *gu 'stand'
 *lə-t͡ɕuŋ 'star'
 *kə 'steal'
 *t͡ɕuŋ 'storehouse, granary'
 *mə-gə-raŋ 'straight'
 *bə-nuŋ 'suck'
 *d͡ʑuʔ 'sun'
 *bə-ljaC 'swallow'
 *mə-jaŋ 'sweet'
 *liŋ 'swell'
 *wa '(swidden) field'
 *d͡ʑaC 'swim'
 *mə-lə-mrjaj 'tail'
 *ləw 'take'
 *t͡ɕaC 'tell'
 *rəŋ 'ten'
 *paj-t͡ɕi 'that'
 *pu-t͡ɕi 'that (lower)'
 *mə-lu 'thigh'
 *huŋ 'this'
 *gə-θəm 'three'
 *gə-d͡ʑuC 'thorn'
 *bə-laj 'tongue'
 *mə-taC 'tooth'
 * 'tree'
 *gə-niC 'two'
 *an-lə-giN 'uncooked rice'
 *pen 'vegetable'
 *mu 'vomit'
 *daj 'walk'
 *t͡ɕaC 'hot, warm'
 *wi 'water'
 *kua-suʔ 'waterfall'
 *traj 'weave'
 *tiŋ 'what'
 *kəʔ 'where'
 *mə-gə-raN 'white'
 *θu 'who'
 *low 'wind'
 *gə/mə-t͡ɕəwC 'wing'
 *d͡ʑVru 'with'
 * 'wood'
 *nəməraj 'woman'
 *də-niŋ 'year'
 *də-gaC 'yesterday'
 *mə-nuŋ 'younger sibling'
 *na(-jaŋ) '1SG'
 *ni '2SG'
 *ʔi '3SG'
 *ka-ni '1PL'
 *d͡ʑV '2PL'
 *na '3PL'

See also
Hrusish comparative vocabulary lists (Wiktionary)

Further reading
Abraham, Binny, Kara Sako, Elina Kinny, Isapdaile Zeliang. 2018. Sociolinguistic Research among Selected Groups in Western Arunachal Pradesh: Highlighting Monpa. SIL Electronic Survey Reports 2018-009.

References

Anderson, Gregory D.S. 2014. On the classification of the Hruso (Aka) language. Paper presented at the 20th Himalayan Languages Symposium, Nanyang Technological University, Singapore.
 
 George van Driem (2001) Languages of the Himalayas: An Ethnolinguistic Handbook of the Greater Himalayan Region. Brill.

 
Languages of India
Proposed language families